Luis Carlos Gómez Centurión (May 31, 1922 – November 17, 2006) was an Argentine politician, military man, and de facto ruler of the province of Corrientes.

1922 births
People from Mendoza, Argentina
Argentine politicians
2006 deaths
Argentine generals